The Arrival of Wang is a 2011 Italian science fiction drama film directed by the Manetti Bros.

The film premiered at the 68th Venice International Film Festival on 4 September 2011.

Cast
Ennio Fantastichini as Curti
Francesca Cuttica as Gaia Aloisi
Juliet Esey Joseph as Cynthia Amounike
Li Yong as Wang (voice)
Antonello Morroni as Max
Jader Giraldi as Falco
Carmen Giardina as the Doctor
Rodolfo Baldini as De Renzi
Angelo Nicotra as the General
Massimo Triggiani as Riboldi
Furio Ferrari Pocoleri as Torricelli

References

External links

2011 films
Films directed by the Manetti Bros.
2010s Italian-language films
2011 science fiction films
Italian science fiction films
2010s Italian films